137 may refer to:

137 (number)
137 BC
AD 137
137 (album), an album by The Pineapple Thief
137 (MBTA bus)
137 (New Jersey bus)